is a Japanese former baseball pitcher. 

Yabuta made his professional debut with the Marines in 1996, and spent 12 years with the organization. He competed in the 2006 World Baseball Classic and struck out Alex Rodriguez, Johnny Damon, and Derrek Lee. He served as a setup man for the Marines in 2007 recording a 4–6 record with a 2.73 ERA in 58 games. After the season, he declared his free agency and came to America to pursue a Major League Baseball career. On November 22, 2007, the Kansas City Star reported that the Kansas City Royals agreed with Yabuta on a two-year contract with a club option for 2010.

Yabuta officially signed with the Royals on November 28, 2007. He signed a two-year, $6 million deal with the Kansas City Royals. The deal included a $4 million club option for a third year. Yabuta was sent down to Triple-A Omaha Royals on June 25, 2008. He was designated for assignment on August 2 and was eventually sent outright to the minors. He was brought back to the Royals when the rosters expanded on September 1.

His teammates on the Royals have given him the nickname "Shake."

On November 24, 2009, he signed a one-year deal with his old team Chiba Lotte, and he has remained with the team since.

References

External links

 Yasuhiko Yabuta Official Web Site
Japanese league stats and info of Yasuhiko Yabuta

1973 births
2006 World Baseball Classic players
Chiba Lotte Marines players
Japanese expatriate baseball players in the United States
Kansas City Royals players
Living people
Major League Baseball players from Japan
Nippon Professional Baseball pitchers
Omaha Royals players
People from Kishiwada, Osaka
Baseball people from Osaka Prefecture